Amata romeii is a moth of the family Erebidae. It was described by Emilio Berio in 1941 and is found in Somalia.

References

 Arctiidae genus list at Butterflies and Moths of the World of the Natural History Museum

Endemic fauna of Somalia
romeii
Moths described in 1941
Moths of Africa